A reflux suppressant is any one of a number of drugs used to combat oesophageal reflux. Commonly, following ingestion a 'raft' of alginic acid is created, floating on the stomach contents by carbon dioxide released by the drug. This forms a mechanical barrier to further reflux. Some preparations also contain antacids to protect the oesophagus.

Reflux can also be coincidentally reduced by the motility stimulants and antidopaminergics.

References

Drugs acting on the gastrointestinal system and metabolism